Solbiate Olona is a comune (municipality) in the Province of Varese in the Italian region Lombardy, located about 30 km northwest of Milan and about 20 km south of Varese. As of 31 December 2020, it had a population of 5,414 and an area of 4.9 km².

Solbiate Olona borders the following municipalities: Fagnano Olona, Gorla Maggiore, Gorla Minore, Olgiate Olona.

Demographic evolution

References

External links
 www.solbiateolona.org

Cities and towns in Lombardy